At the 2009 Jeux de la Francophonie, the athletics events were held at the Camille Chamoun Sports City Stadium from 1 to 6 October. A total of 46 track and field events were contested.

Medal summary

Men

Women

Medal table

Games records

Participation
Key: Country (no. of athletes)

 (3)
 French Community of Belgium (6)
 (8)
 (11)
 (8)
 (1)
 (15)
 (65)
 (7)
 (10)
 (4)
 (5)
 (6)
 (7)
 (4)
 (14)
 (4)
 (55)
 (2)
 (1)
 (34) (host)
 (8)
 (4)
 (13)
 (1)
 (33)
 (2)
 (4)
 (15)
 (7)
 (18)
 (3)
 (9)
 (3)
 (5)
 (2)

References
General
Livre de résultats – Athlétisme. 2009 Jeux de la Francophonie (2009). Retrieved on 2009-10-08.
Sports results at the official 2009 Jeux de la Francophonie website 
Vazel, P-J (2009-10-02). El Ghazaly heads double success for Egypt - Francophone Games, Day 1. IAAF. Retrieved on 2009-10-03.
Vazel, P-J (2009-10-03). Berrabah’s 8.40m Moroccan Long Jump record highlights - Francophone Games, Day 2. IAAF. Retrieved on 2009-10-03.
Vazel, P-J (2009-10-04). Nadjina and Milazar take 400m titles in Beirut - Francophone Games, Day 3. IAAF. Retrieved on 2009-10-04.
Vazel, P-J (2009-10-05). Montebrun’s record the pinnacle of results - Francophone Games, Day 4. IAAF. Retrieved on 2009-10-07.
Vazel, P-J (2009-10-06). Three complete double triumphs - Francophone Games, Day 5. IAAF. Retrieved on 2009-10-07.

Specific

External links
Official website 

Francophonie
Athletics
2009